Tobias Lauritsen (born 30 August 1997) is a Norwegian footballer who plays as a striker for Eredivisie side Sparta Rotterdam.

Career

Club
Lauritsen started his career in Herkules and got his first-team debut in 2013. Midway in the season Herkules had to pull its team from league play, making the entire player roster available for transfer. Lauritsen went to Urædd FK together with Kevin Jablinski among others. One year later, Lauritsen progressed to the regional giants Odds BK where Jablinski had already gone.

Lauritsen made his Odd debut in the 2015 Norwegian Football Cup first round, coming off the bench and scoring in a 13–0 thrashing of Skotfoss. He then mainly saw playing time for Odds BK 2, the B team, in the 2015 2. divisjon, playing one more first-team game, the first leg of the 2016 Norwegian Football Cup.

In the summer of 2016 Odd picked up the talent Stefan Mladenovic from another neighboring club Pors, and Pors wanted Lauritsen and other players in a player exchange deal. The deal did not go through, but in September 2016 Lauritsen joined Pors anyway. Sustaining an injury in his debut game, Lauritsen could not prevent relegation from the 2016 2. divisjon, but in the 2017 3. divisjon he scored 32 goals in 26 league games. As a result he was bought by his old club Odd. He finally made his Eliteserien debut, as a substitute in the league opener against Haugesund, and in the first round of the 2018 Norwegian Football Cup he bagged four goals.

On 21 June 2022, Lauritsen signed a three-year contract with Dutch club Sparta Rotterdam that came into effect at the end of July 2022.

Career statistics

Club

References

1997 births
Living people
Sportspeople from Skien
Norwegian footballers
Pors Grenland players
Odds BK players
Eliteserien players
Association football forwards